Postoyaly is a rural locality (a khutor) in Lisichanskoye Rural Settlement, Olkhovatsky District, Voronezh Oblast, Russia. The population was 262 as of 2010. There are 4 streets.

Geography 
Postoyaly is located 19 km northeast of Olkhovatka (the district's administrative centre) by road. Politotdelskoye is the nearest rural locality.

References 

Rural localities in Olkhovatsky District